The Diocese of Ardagh can refer to:
The Roman Catholic Diocese of Ardagh and Clonmacnoise
The Church of Ireland Diocese of Kilmore, Elphin and Ardagh

See also
The Bishop of Ardagh
The Bishop of Kilmore, Elphin and Ardagh